1891 was the second season of County Championship cricket in England. There were no international tours. The County Championship was won by Surrey in even more dominant fashion than previously as they won twelve of their 16 games. Debutants Somerset finished fifth out of the nine teams.

Honours
County Championship - Surrey
Wisden (Five Great Bowlers) - William Attewell, J T Hearne, Frederick Martin, Arthur Mold, John Sharpe

County Championship

Final table 

Points system:

 1 for a win
 0 for a draw
 −1 for a loss

Most runs in the County Championship

Most wickets in the County Championship

Overall first-class statistics

Leading batsmen

Leading bowlers

References

Annual reviews
 James Lillywhite's Cricketers' Annual (Red Lilly), Lillywhite, 1892
 Wisden Cricketers' Almanack 1892

External links
 Cricket in England in 1891

1891 in English cricket
1891